Clean Cut is the 14th solo studio album by American country music artist Barbara Mandrell. The album was released in March 1984 on MCA Records and was produced by Tom Collins. It was one of two studio albums Mandrell released in 1984.

Background and content 
Clean Cut was recorded in January 1984 at the Woodland Sound Studio in Nashville, Tennessee, United States. Like Mandrell's previous releases, the album contained 10 tracks. Most of the song's themes were built around the traditional working class country music perspective but had a country pop arrangement. Songs such as "Only a Lonely Heart Knows", "Happy Birthday Dear Heartache", and "I Can Depend on You" had a significant pop-sounding arrangement. Like most of Barbara's MCA output, Clean Cut was only ever issued on a long-playing record, with five songs per side.

Release 
Unlike her previous releases, Clean Cut spawned three singles in 1984. "Happy Birthday Dear Heartache" was the first single from the album released in January 1984. The song peaked at No. 3 on the Billboard Magazine Country Singles Chart and No. 18 on the Canadian RPM Country Tracks chart. The second single, "Only a Lonely Heart Knows" was issued in May 1984 and reached No. 2 on the Billboard Country Singles Chart and became her final number one hit on the Canadian Country chart. "Crossword Puzzle" was the third and final single released from the album, reaching No. 11 on the Billboard Country chart, becoming her first single since 1981 to miss the Top 10 on the chart. Clean Cut was also released in 1984 and peaked at No. 8 on the Billboard Magazine Top Country Albums chart and peaked outside the Billboard 200 albums chart, reaching No. 204.

Track listing 
Side one
"Happy Birthday Dear Heartache" (Mack David, Archie Jordan) – 2:34
"If It's Not One Thing, It's Another" (Steve Dean, Frank J. Myers) – 3:48
"I Can Depend on You" (Dennis Morgan, Stephen Allen Davis) – 3:54
"I Wonder What the Rich Folk Are Doin' Tonight" (W. T. Davidson, Myers, Dean) – 2:49
"Crossword Puzzle" (Dean, Myers) – 3:37

Side two
"Only a Lonely Heart Knows" (Morgan, Davis) – 3:48
"Just Like Old Times" (Rafe Van Hoy, Deborah Allen) – 2:58
"Look What Love Has Done" (Morgan, Davis) – 3:21
"Take Care of You" (Morgan, Davis) – 3:00
"Sincerely, I'm Yours" (David, Jordan) – 2:48

Personnel
Acoustic Guitar: Pete Bordonali, Jimmy Capps, Dennis Morgan, Frank J. Myers
Banjo: Fred Newell
Bass guitar: David Hungate, Joe Osborn
Drums: Eddie Bayers, James Stroud
Electric Guitar: Pete Bordonali, Larry Byrom, Jon Goin
Fiddle: Hoot Hester
Harmonica: Terry McMillan
Piano: David Briggs, Bobby Ogdin
Rhodes Piano: David Briggs, Bobby Ogdin
Slide Guitar: Larry Byrom
Steel Guitar: Sonny Garrish
Strings: The Nashville String Machine
String Arranger: Archie Jordan, D. Bergen White
Synthesizer: Bobby Ogdin, Alan Steinberger
Tambourine: Tim Farmer, James Stroud

Charts

Weekly charts

Year-end charts

Singles

References 

1984 albums
Barbara Mandrell albums
MCA Records albums
Albums produced by Tom Collins (record producer)